Ankush is a given name. Notable people with the name include:

 Ankush Hazra, Indian Actor 
 Ankush Arora, Indian actor and singer
 Ankush Bains (born 1995), Indian cricketer
 Ankush Chaudhari, Indian actor
 Ankushita Boro, Indian boxer
 Ankush Saikia (born 1975), Indian author
 Ankush Singh (born 1998), Indian cricketer